Cremastocheilus beameri is a species of scarab beetle in the family Scarabaeidae.

Subspecies
These two subspecies belong to the species Cremastocheilus beameri:
 Cremastocheilus beameri beameri
 Cremastocheilus beameri pokorny Krajcik, 2014

References

Further reading

 

Cetoniinae
Articles created by Qbugbot
Beetles described in 1940